The Civil Courage Prize is a human rights award which recognizes "steadfast resistance to evil at great personal risk—rather than military valor." The prize was founded in 2000 by the Northcote Parkinson Fund. The goal of the prize is not to create a "ranking", but "to draw attention individually to some extraordinary heroes of conscience." It was inspired by the example of Soviet dissident Alexander Solzhenitsyn.

History

In 2007, the Northcote Parkinson Fund's name was changed to The Train Foundation in recognition of the contributions of the family of investment advisor John Train, the fund's primary donor.

In 2022, the board of trustees consisted of seven members:
John Train (chair)
George C. Biddle, Trustee and Co-Chairman; Chairman, World Connect (co-chair)
Louis N. Bickford, CEO of MEMRIA.ORG (treasurer)
Ariadne Calvo-Platero, journalist (president)
Musa T. Klebnikov, Paul Klebnikov Fund Executive Director
The Hon. Nicholas Platt, Former U.S. Ambassador
Ann Brownell Sloane, The Eisenhower Foundation

Since 2000, the foundation has awarded the Civil Courage Prize one or two activists each year.  The prize comes with a $25,000 honorarium. Nominations are accepted from international non-governmental organizations, while unsolicited nominations are discouraged. The award ceremony is held in New York City or London in October of each year. Keynote speakers have included British historian Michael Howard, US journalist Jon Meacham, British Home Secretary Douglas Hurd, and Chilean President Michelle Bachelet.

Seven posthumous award winners have also been named, ranging from Swedish businessman Raoul Wallenberg, who worked to save the lives of Hungarian Jews during World War II, to Indonesian human rights activist Munir Said Thalib, assassinated in 2004. In 2004 and 2005, the Foundation also awarded "Certificates of Distinction in Civil Courage" to selected prize finalists. The certificates included honorariums of $1,000 apiece.

Honorees

Posthumous honorees

Certificates of Distinction in Civil Courage

References

External links
Official website

Human rights awards
Awards established in 2000
Humanitarian and service awards
Courage awards